Brush Ridge is an unincorporated community in Grand Prairie Township, Marion County, Ohio, United States.

History
Brush Ridge was one of the first communities in Marion County, and at one time the largest community in Grand Prairie Township, the Free-Will Baptist Church (now Grand Prairie Baptist Church) was built here in 1867.  In 1900, the "Brush Ridge Horse Protecting Company of Marion and Wyandot Counties" was established here. In 1907, when the community was suddenly overrun by rats, a rather famous six-week-long rat hunt was held, with a total of 6,600 rats having been killed.

Geography

The Little Sandusky River begins near Brush Ridge.

References

Unincorporated communities in Marion County, Ohio